Gleviceras is an ammonite genus (order Ammonitida) that lived during the Early Jurassic Period, found in Canada, Hungary, Mexico and the United Kingdom.

Glevumites Buckman 1924, Guibaliceras Buckman 1918,  Riparioceras Schindewolf 1962, Tutchericeras Buckman 1919, and Victoriceras Buckman 1918 are considered synonyms.

Description
Gleviceras produced laterally compressed involute shells with a small umbilicus, close spaced sinuous ribbing, and a sharp keel along venter. The suture in ammonitic with deep narrow complex lobes. It is similar to Oxynoticeras except for being less narrow and having a more rounded venter. Fastigiceras differs primarily in having an occluded umbilicus.

Taxonomy
Gleviceras was described by Buckman in 1918 and is included in the Family Oxynoticeratidae and superfamily Psiloceratoidea. 
Species include:
 Gleviceras doris Reynes, 1879
 Gleviceras guibalianum D'orbigny, 1844
 Gleviceras iridescens Tutcher and Trueman, 1925
 Gleviceras lotharingius Reynes, 1879
 Gleviceras palomense Erben, 1956

Gleviceras is closely related to the genera Cheltonia, Hypoxynoticeras, Oxynoticeras, Paracymbites, Paroxynoticeras, Radstockiceras and Slatterites.

References

 W.J. Arkell et al., 1957. Mesozoic Ammonoidea, Treatise on Invertebrate Paleontology, Part L, Geological Society of America and University of Kansas Press. (L240 -243)
 Joachim Blau. et al. A new fossiliferous site of Lower Liassic (Upper Sinemurian) marine sediments from the southern Sierra Madre Oriental (Puebla, Mexico): Revista Mexicana de Ciencias Geológicas, v. 25, núm. 3, 2008, p. 402-407 

Oxynoticeratidae
Ammonitida genera
Jurassic ammonites
Ammonites of Europe